Teatro Bolívar is a theatre in Quito, Ecuador. It was established on 15 April 1933, with a capacity of 2400 spectators. It hosted many notable events, including the Miss Ecuador 1996 contest. In 1997, it underwent significant restoration, only to be plagued by fire two years later.

References

External links
Official site 

Theatres in Ecuador
Buildings and structures in Quito
1933 establishments in Ecuador